Foreign Affair is the seventh solo studio album by Tina Turner, released on September 13, 1989, through Capitol Records. It was Turner's third album release after her massively successful comeback five years earlier with Private Dancer and her third and last album with the label. Although the album was not a major success in Turner's native United States, it was a huge international hit, especially in Europe. The album reached number one on the UK Albums Chart, her first number one album there. Dan Hartman produced most of the tracks on the album, including the hit single "The Best", which has gone on to become one of Turner's signature songs.

Commercial success
While Foreign Affair didn't perform as well as Turner's previous albums Private Dancer and Break Every Rule in the US, where it failed to crack the Top 30 in the Billboard 200, it was a worldwide hit, selling over six million copies. In the UK alone the album sold over 1.5 million copies entering the UK Albums Chart at number one (Turner's first album to do so there) and staying in Top 100 for a year and a half. The album also reached number one in numerous other countries including Germany and Sweden and topped the overall European Chart for four weeks.

In 2021, Foreign Affair was released as a box set, which includes a previously unreleased demo of "The Best".

Single releases
Six tracks from the album were released as singles, most of which became hits in various parts of Europe and, to a lesser extent in the US. "The Best" (US No. 15; UK No. 5) was released as the first single propelling the sales of the album. This was followed by "I Don't Wanna Lose You" (UK No. 8), which was released in Europe only. The album's third single (second in the US) was the opening track, "Steamy Windows" (US. No. 39; UK No. 13), which earned Turner a Grammy nomination.

Three additional singles released in various territories were the title track "Foreign Affair" (Continental Europe only), the ballad "Look Me in the Heart" (No. 8 on the US Adult Contemporary chart; UK No. 31) and the rock ballad "Be Tender with Me Baby" (UK No. 28).

Track listing

Notes
 signifies additional producer
 signifies remix
 signifies post-production and remix

Personnel 

 Tina Turner – lead vocals (all tracks), backing vocals (3, 7, 8, 10), arrangements (2, 8)
 Dan Hartman – electric piano (1, 3, 4), organ (1, 4), keyboards (2, 3, 11), acoustic guitar (2, 6, 8, 11), backing vocals (2, 5), percussion programming (5), Moog bass (11), drum programming (11)
 Jeff Bova – horn section (1, 4, 5), synth bass (3), organ (4), strings (5)
 Phil Ashley – keyboards (2, 7), bass pulse (2), organ (6), synthesizers (6), strings (6, 7, 8), acoustic piano (8), flute (8)
 Elliot Lewis – additional keyboards (2, 8), strings (2, 8), flute (11)
 Philippe Saisse – additional keyboards (2, 3, 6, 8), slap bass (3), flute solo (5), keyboard mallet and chimes (7)
 Rupert Hine – keyboards (9), bass (9), drum programming (9), backing vocals (9)
 Nick Glennie-Smith – keyboards (10, 12), strings (10, 12), synth bass (12), drum programming (12), bell tree (12)
 Casey Young – keyboards (10)
 Greg Mathieson – synth bass (10)
 Eddie Martinez – rhythm guitar (1, 3, 4), all guitars (5)
 Neil Taylor – slide guitar (1), guitar solo (1)
 Tony Joe White – lead guitar (1, 3, 4, 12), rhythm guitar (1, 3, 4, 12), harmonica (1, 3), synth bass (1, 4)
 Gene Black – rhythm guitar (2, 7, 8), lead guitar (6, 7), guitar solo (6), guitar (10)
 James Ralston – rhythm guitar (2, 6, 7, 8), guitar (10)
 Pat Thrall – guitar solo (2), additional lead guitar fills (6), slide guitar (8), electric guitar (11)
 Phil Palmer – guitars (9)
 Mark Knopfler – guitars (12)
 Carmine Rojas – bass guitar (1, 4, 5)
 T. M. Stevens – bass guitar (2, 3, 6, 7, 8, 11)
 J. T. Lewis – drums (1, 3, 4, 5)
 Art Wood – drums (2, 6, 7, 8)
 Geoff Dugmore – drums (10)
 Danny Cummings – percussion (3, 4, 7), shaker (5), congas (7)
 Albert Hammond – shaker (10), backing vocals (10)
 Gary Barnacle – all saxophones (1, 12), saxophone solo (10)
 Edgar Winter – saxophone solo (2)
 Tim Cappello – saxophone solo (5, 8)
 Roger Davies – arrangements (5)
 Lance Ellington – backing vocals (2, 3, 5, 7, 8, 11)
 Tessa Niles – backing vocals (2, 3, 5–8, 11)
 David Munday – backing vocals (9)
 Sandy Stewart – backing vocals (9)
 Holly Knight – backing vocals (10)
 Graham Lyle – backing vocals (10)

Production
 Dan Hartman – producer (1–8, 11)
 Tina Turner – executive producer, producer (2, 8)
 Rupert Hine – producer (9)
 Roger Davies – executive producer, producer (10, 12)
 Albert Hammond – producer (10)
 Graham Lyle – producer (10)
 Tony Joe White – producer (12)
Technical
 Chris Lord-Alge – recording engineer (1–8, 11), mixing (all tracks)
 Andrew Scarth – recording engineer (9)
 Mike Ging – recording engineer (10, 12)
 Tommy Vicari – recording engineer (10)
 Nick Froome – recording engineer (12)
 Vincent Frerebeau – additional engineer
 John Lee – additional engineer
 Dave O'Donnell – additional engineer
 James Allen-Jones – assistant engineer
 Darren Allison – assistant engineer
 Lee Curle – assistant engineer
 Tim Leitner – assistant engineer
 Paul Logus – assistant engineer
 Ray Pyle – assistant engineer
 David Scott – assistant engineer
 Elliot Singerman – assistant engineer
 Bob Ludwig – mastering 
Studios
 Overdubs recorded at Multi-Level (Westport, CT); The Power Station (New York, NY); Lion Share Recording (Los Angeles, CA); E-Zee Studios (London, UK); Mayfair Studios (Primrose Hill, London, UK); Swanyard Studios (Islington, London, UK).
 Mixed at The Grey Room (Hollywood, CA).
 Mastered at Masterdisk (New York, NY).
Other Credits
 Bill Burks – art direction 
 Tommy Steele – art direction 
 Glenn Sakamoto – design 
 Herb Ritts – center photography 
 Peter Lindbergh – photography

Charts

Weekly charts

Year-end charts

Certifications and sales

References

Tina Turner albums
1989 albums
Albums produced by Rupert Hine
Albums produced by Dan Hartman
Albums produced by Tony Joe White
Capitol Records albums